Vijay Naval Patil (born 5 September 1942, in Navri, Dhule district  (Maharashtra)) was a member of the 6th Lok Sabha from Dhule (Lok Sabha constituency) in Maharashtra State, India.

He was elected to 7th, 8th and 10th Lok Sabha from Erandol (Lok Sabha constituency). He was Union (Dy) Minister for Science & Technology Electronic Space etc. and latter on handled the port folio of Dept. of Communication. He was secretary All India Congress Committee IN-charge of Bihar & Orissa in 1985-86. In Maharashtra- Nominated as President of Rashtriya Ekatmata Samiti (Cabinet Rank) 2002 to 2005.

References

1942 births
People from Dhule district
India MPs 1980–1984
India MPs 1984–1989
India MPs 1977–1979
India MPs 1991–1996
Maharashtra politicians
Lok Sabha members from Maharashtra
Living people
Indian National Congress politicians from Maharashtra